The Cameroon national rugby league team, known as the Indomitable Lions, represent Cameroon in international rugby league football competition.

They made their debut in the 2019 Middle East Africa Championship in October 2019 with a 4-8 loss to Morocco in Lagos, Nigeria, after travelling by bus for eight days go get there.

 the Cameroon team is ranked 36th in the Rugby League International Federation world rankings.

Background
Carol Manga (born ), who grew up  in Yaounde, loved association football as a child, and started playing rugby union at the age of 14, going on to play in the national team at the age of 16. He has captained both rugby sevens and rugby union teams. He moved to Australia in 2008 to play rugby, and discovered and fell in love with rugby league, where he played in Cooma, New South Wales. He took the game back to Cameroon in 2012, helping to establish the Cameroon Rugby League XIII. Ten years later in September 2022, at the age of 34, he is once again in training, with the hope of playing in and possibly captaining the national league team.

2019 squad
Squad for 2019 MEA Rugby League Championship, as of 20 September 2019:

Armel Damdja
Bidjana Jean Claude
Nguele Hermand
Hamadou Moussa
Nanga Yannick Olama
Patrick Eugene Nkouak
Lamere Mfochive Oudi
Yannick Noah Simon
Tientcheu Nguekam Manuel
Moutcheu Jangue Raphael
Yohan C. Kwedi
Kallasi Nguiagueu Arnaud
Embella Mouhamed
Christian T. Pegou
Bekolo Elie
Watio Franck
Fabrice Yepmo Joufang
Fosso Ledoux
Arnaud Ndjeng
Akoa Akoa Jean Marc
Ngoufack Geordane
Kuate Talom Steve

Results

Footnotes

References

National rugby league teams
National sports teams of Cameroon